Shaganappi Trail is a major super-4 expressway in the northwest quadrant of Calgary, Alberta. It extends to the south as Montgomery View, a small service road in the neighbourhood of Montgomery and that provides access to Edworthy Park, passes north past Market Mall and the western boundary of Nose Hill Park, and terminates in the neighbourhood of Nolan Hill in the north, with city planning maps indicating future northern extension beyond 144 Avenue NW.  The name "Shaganappi" is of Cree origin, referring to the bison hide lacings that held Red River ox carts together. Despite the name, it is not located near the Shaganappi neighbourhood, which is located south of the Bow River.

Route 

Shaganappi Trail begins as a short 2 lane road providing access to Edworthy Park. After crossing Bowness Road at a signal light it immediately travels through an interchange with 16 Avenue before widening to a 4 lane cross section with a 70 km/h speed limit. It then climbs up a hill below the Alberta Children's Hospital out of the river valley. At the top it passes through signal lights at University Avenue, 32nd Avenue, 40th Avenue and Varsity Drive passing next to Market Mall and through the community of Varsity. It then passes over Crowchild Trail in a spit diamond interchange before continuing past Northland Mall. The road widens to 5 lanes a passes through lights at Dalhousie Drive and John Laurie Boulevard and the speed limit rises to 80km/h. The road then cuts up a steep hill through Nose Hill park where deer are frequently seen. After passing an intersection for Edgemont it then descends down another steep hill past some lights at Country Hills Boulevard. After that the expressway ends and the road shrinks to 2 lanes and the speed limit goes down to 60km/h. It crosses Stoney Trail at a partial Cloverleaf interchange before widening to a 4 lane arterial road. From there it continues north until arriving at its terminus with 144 Avenue.

History 
Shaganappi Trail was originally planned in 1970 to be part of a network of freeways. The 1970 functional study planned it to extend south as a controlled access road from the future ring road (now Stoney Trail) past several Interchanges to a three-level interchange at Crowchild Trail. From there on it would continue through Varsity, past Interchanges connecting to Market Mall and then down the hill to connect to a massive six-way, free-flowing combination interchange with a proposed Highway 1 freeway and Memorial Drive. (Now called Bowness Road). From there it would then cross the Bow River and connect with Bow Trail and Sarcee Trail at another major interchange. Edworthy Park on both sides of the rivers was meant to be a temporary park to protect the right-of-way, since there are no Bow River crossings between 16 Avenue NW to the west and Crowchild Trail to the east. The 6-lane freeway was planned to be built in three stages, with the first stage being built soon after the functional plan was released. The first stage involved constructing Shaganappi as a 4 lane limited-access road with signalized intersections. It was constructed from Bowness Road to what is now Country Hills Boulevard. At the same time, the small overpass carrying 16 Ave was grandfathered into an interchange with Shaganappi from an older road arrangement. The plan to extend Shaganappi across the river and upgrade it to a freeway was proposed again in the 1995 Calgary Transportation Plan, also known as the "Go Plan"; however public opposition to both it and a similar plan to extend Sarcee Trail through a natural area, led to it officially being eliminated from the plans in 2009. As a result the road remains mostly in its stage one configuration in the present time.

In the 1990s the road was extended into Hidden Valley and a split diamond interchange was constructed at Crowchild trail. The road was extended beyond the Stoney trail right of way when the Sherwood community was developed around 2005. In 2009 when northwest Stoney Trail opened, a Partial cloverleaf interchange with a 3-lane overpass was constructed to service Shaganappi. However, grading was put in place to allow it to be easily upgraded to a combination interchange if the freeway plans were implemented. Shaganappi was extended north as an Arterial road to 144 Ave in 2013 as more neighbourhoods were built. 144 ave is currently the edge of the city, but when future communities get built farther north, Shaganappi will likely be extended further.

Future 
After the cancelation of the extension south of the Bow River and the 16 Avenue connecting freeway Shaganappi Trail was downgraded in classification to an arterial road south of Crowchild Trail. Recently made long term plans have moved away from freeway conversion and instead plan a 6 lane arterial street with curb HOV lanes, additional signalized intersections and bike lanes. The confusing and accident-prone interchange complex at 16 Ave, Bowness road and Shaganappi Trail also is now planned to be replaced by a diamond Interchange favouring 16 Avenue resulting in 2 new signal lights along Shagannapi. Between Crowchild and Stoney Trail, Shagannapi remains classified as a skeletal road by the City of Calgary and freeway upgrades still remains a possibility in the long term. That section of the corridor is also planned to contain a future BRT route as well which may run on the shoulder of the Shaganappi trail or on its own parallel road.  constructed as limited-access road to allow for upgrades to freeway up to Stoney Trail with grading in place to allow for it to be upgraded to a combination interchange; Starting in 2021 the overpass at Stoney trail is going to be twinned to allow for 6 lanes to cross Stoney rather than the current 3. As part of the project a full access signalized intersection is planned at Hidden Valley Drive.

Major intersections 
From south to north.

Pedestrian crossings
Because of the roadway's width, high traffic volume, and the need for pedestrians to cross it, three dedicated crossings have been built, one at Market Mall, one near Valiant Drive, and one at Northland Village Mall called the Shaganappi Trail Pedestrian Overpass (2015).

See also 

Transportation in Calgary

References

Cancelled highway projects in Canada
Roads in Calgary